The Catholic Church in Guernsey is part of the worldwide Catholic Church, under the spiritual leadership of the Pope in Rome.

Although Guernsey is not part of the United Kingdom, for administrative purposes the diocese comes under the jurisdiction of the English Diocese of Portsmouth.

Churches

There are three Catholic churches on Guernsey - two in St Peter Port (St Joseph & St Mary and Notre Dame Du Rosaire) and one in St Sampson's (Our Lady Star of the Sea, Delancey).

External links
Homepage of the Catholic Church in Guernsey

 
Christianity in Guernsey
Guernsey